Castle Leslie, also known as Glaslough House is home to an Irish branch of Clan Leslie, is located on the 4 km² (1,000-acre) Castle Leslie Estate adjacent to the village of Glaslough,  northeast of Monaghan town in County Monaghan, Ireland.

Architecture
There was a 17th century Leslie mansion at Glaslough until the 19th century when much of it was demolished by Sir john Leslie. Jonathan Swift stayed at that mansion and described it as 'With rows of books upon its shelves, written by Leslies all about themselves.'

The current castle is fashioned in the Scottish Baronial style and was designed by the firm of Lanyon, Lynn and Lanyon in 1870 for Sir John Leslie, 1st Baronet, MP. It is situated where an earlier castle stood and never had a defensive purpose.  The country house presents a rather dour and austere façade and is sited in such a way so as to mask the gardens to an approaching visitor. To the rear of the house the gardens are relieved by a Renaissance style cloister which is allegedly designed to ape Michaelangelo's cloister at Santa Maria degli Angeli in Rome. which links the main house to a single story wing containing the Library and Billiard Room. In contrast to the exterior designed by W.H. Lynn, the interior shows the hands of Lanyon and John Leslie himself through its strong Italian Renaissance feel.

The estate

The estate has three lakes: the largest, Glaslough (from the Irish Glas Loch or Glasloch, meaning Green Lake), shares its name with the local village; Kilvey Lake is to the north; and, finally, there is Dream Lake, which features a crannóg. The  estate comprises park land, meandering streams and several forests. The house is still home to the Leslie family, the late Sir Jack Leslie (6 December 1916 - 16 April 2016) returned to live at Castle Leslie at the age of 78 and the principal owner is Samantha (Sammy) Leslie. Other family members still assert their influence on the running of the estate through a family trust.

Events and visitors
Castle Leslie gained media attention in 2002 when Sir Paul McCartney married Heather Mills in the family church located on the estate, followed by a wedding banquet for 300 guests prepared by then executive chef, Noel McMeel.

Throughout the years numerous famous people have frequented the house. This includes Irish poet WB Yeats, Irish statesman General Michael Collins, Rolling Stones frontman Sir Mick Jagger (1966), British astronomer Sir Patrick Moore and the Duc de Valentinois. The estate has also had various members of the Churchill family within the house due to familial ties with the Leslies.

References

External links

Castles in County Monaghan
Scottish baronial architecture
Clan Leslie
William Henry Lynn buildings